The Meade Islands are a group of two large islands, Zverino Island and Cave Island, the minor Pisanitsa Island, and several rocks lying in the north entrance to McFarlane Strait, off Archar Peninsula, Greenwich Island in the South Shetland Islands, Antarctica. The area was visited by early 19th-century sealers.

The islands were charted in 1935 by Discovery Investigations and named after C.M. Meade, Cartographer-in-charge in the Admiralty Hydrographic Office at that time.

Location 

See also 
 Composite Antarctic Gazetteer
 List of Antarctic islands south of 60° S
 SCAR
 Territorial claims in Antarctica

Map
 L.L. Ivanov et al. Antarctica: Livingston Island and Greenwich Island, South Shetland Islands. Scale 1:100000 topographic map. Sofia: Antarctic Place-names Commission of Bulgaria, 2005.

Notes

References
 Meade Islands. SCAR Composite Antarctic Gazetteer

Islands of the South Shetland Islands